SS Oregon (1878–1906) was a coastal passenger/cargo ship constructed in Chester, Pennsylvania by the Delaware River Iron Ship Building and Engine Works in February 1878. Originally delivered to the Oregon Steamship Company, she was used on the Portland, Oregon-to-San Francisco, California route for many years. In 1879, the Oregon Railroad and Navigation Company became the Oregon′s new owners after purchasing the Oregon Steamship Company. Also included in this purchase were the steamships George W. Elder and City of Chester. While in O.R. & N service, Oregon served alongside SS Columbia, which made the first commercial use of Thomas Edison's incandescent light bulb. Like Oregon, Columbia was also built by John Roach & Sons in Chester, Pennsylvania. Over time, Oregon's hull became breached after a number of incidents. Furthermore, the hull had been weighted with concrete to the point where she was considered unsuitable for service as a passenger liner. After operating as a cargo ship, she was laid up in 1894 at Portland. In 1899, the Oregon was re-qualified to carry passengers once more. She was sold by O.R. & N the same year. Despite this, she was viewed as a cursed ship by her crew. On 26 December 1889 she sank  in a collision in snow in the Columbia River at Coffee Rock 47 miles above Astoria, Oregon. Two of Clan McKenzie's crew killed, one injured. Her bow was damaged and she drifted ashore, later pulled off.

The steamship appears as docked In Alaska at the time for the 1900 census.

The Oregon was owned by the White Star Steamship Company (not to be confused with the White Star Line) from around 1902 to 1905 . Around this time, Oregon was operating between Alaska and Puget Sound.

On September 13, 1906, Oregon ran aground on the rocky shoreline of Cape Hinchinbrook, Alaska. At the time, there was no active lighthouse at Cape Hinchinbrook, although one was under construction. It is unknown whether poor navigation or reduced visibility caused the wreck. Shortly after the collision, the bottom of the vessel tore open and water began flooding the ship. Oregon became stuck on the rocks without any barrier from the open sea. After crew members began boarding the lifeboats without orders, Captain Horace E. Soule threatened to shoot any man attempting to steal one. This led to the crew obeying all further orders and a small party was sent off in a lifeboat to report the disaster in Valdez, Alaska. When the report of Oregon′s wreck reached Valdez, many ships set out to rescue the passengers and crew. Remarkably, all 110 remaining people on board the Oregon were rescued by the revenue cutter . Oregon however, was reported as a total loss.

References

External links
University of Washington Libraries - Search results for Oregon (Steamship) - A webpage that contains photographs of the SS Oregon.

Steamships of the United States
Shipwrecks of the Alaska coast
Maritime incidents in 1906
1878 ships
Passenger ships of the United States
Ships built by the Delaware River Iron Ship Building and Engine Works
Maritime incidents in December 1889